Nina Bang Mountain is a mountain in NW Greenland. Administratively it is part of Avannaata municipality. This peak was named after Denmark's first woman cabinet minister Nina Bang.

Geography
Nina Bang Mountain is located in southwestern Nyeboe Land.

See also
List of mountains in Greenland

Bibliography
Greenland geology and selected mineral occurrences - GEUS

References

Nina